The 2014 The Philadelphia Cycling Classic is a one-day women's cycle race held in the United States on 1 June 2014. The race had a UCI rating of 1.1.

Results

See also
 2014 in women's road cycling

References

Philadelphia Cycling Classic
Philadelphia Cycling Classic
Philadelphia Cycling Classic
Philadelphia Cycling Classic
2014 in sports in Pennsylvania